The Forbidden Thing is a 1920 American silent drama film directed by Allan Dwan and starring James Kirkwood, Helen Jerome Eddy and Marcia Manon.

Cast
 James Kirkwood as Abel Blake 
 Helen Jerome Eddy as Joan 
 Marcia Manon as Glory Prada 
 King Baggot as Dave 
 Gertrude Claire as Mrs. Blake 
 Jack Roseleigh as Jose 
 Arthur Thalasso as Joe Portega 
 Newton Hall as The Boy
 Harry Griffith as Ryan
 Katherine Norton as Mrs. Ryan

References

Bibliography
 Frederic Lombardi. Allan Dwan and the Rise and Decline of the Hollywood Studios. McFarland, 2013.

External links
 

1920 films
1920 drama films
1920s English-language films
American silent feature films
Silent American drama films
American black-and-white films
Films directed by Allan Dwan
1920s American films